Sedges, Cyperaceae, are a family of graminoid (grass-like) flowering plants named for the saw-like edges of their leaves.

Sedge may also refer to:

Plants 
 Acorus calamus, sweet flag, a plant in the family Acoraceae
 Carex, the true sedge genus

Other uses 
 , a United States coastguard
 Nickname of Liversedge F.C., a football (soccer) club in West Yorkshire, England
 A term of venery or collective noun for several species of birds, including bitterns, cranes and herons

See also